Jacqueline Delubac (1907–1997) was a French stage and film actress. She was married to Sacha Guitry and appeared in a number of his productions on both stage and screen.

Selected filmography
 Let's Get Married (1931)
 Topaze (1933)
 Good Luck (1935)
 Confessions of a Cheat (1936)
 Let's Make a Dream (1936)
 The New Testament (1936)
 The Pearls of the Crown (1937)
 Désiré (1937)
 Girls in Distress (1939)
 Hangman's Noose (1940)
 La Comédie du bonheur (1940)
 The Man Who Seeks the Truth (1940)
 My First Love (1945)
 The Ferret (1950)

References

Bibliography
 Williams, Alan. Film and Nationalism. Rutgers University Press, 2002.

External links

1907 births
1997 deaths
French film actresses
French stage actresses
Actresses from Lyon
20th-century French women